Gunning Bedford Sr. (April 7, 1742 – September 30, 1797) was an American lawyer and politician from New Castle, in New Castle County, Delaware. He was an officer in the Continental Army during the American Revolution, and a member of the Federalist Party, who served in the Delaware General Assembly and as Governor of Delaware. He is often confused with his cousin, Gunning Bedford Jr., who was a delegate to the U.S. Constitutional Convention of 1787.

Early life and family
Bedford was born on a farm in New Castle Hundred, near the town of New Castle, son of William and Catherine Jacquett Bedford. William Bedford was the grandson of another William Bedford who came to Delaware from Virginia around 1680, and who himself was the grandson of an English immigrant to Jamestown, Virginia in 1621. Gunning Bedford was educated at the Academy of Pennsylvania and married Mary Read, the sister of George Read in 1769. They had no children. They lived at 6 The Strand in New Castle and were members of Immanuel Episcopal Church. He began his career as a merchant at New Castle, but later studied law, and was admitted to the Delaware Bar in 1779.

Political career
Bedford was elected to four terms in the House of Assembly beginning with the 1783/84 session and serving through the 1786/87 session. He was elected a delegate to the U.S. Congress under the Articles of Confederation in 1786/87, but resigned shortly afterwards on January 15, 1787. He then was elected to a term on the Legislative Council beginning with the 1788/89 session. In October 1795 he was the Federalist candidate for governor, defeating Dr. Archibald Alexander, a retired army surgeon. He served as governor from January 19, 1796 until his death on September 30, 1797.

Death and legacy
Bedford died at New Castle and is buried there in the Immanuel Episcopal Church Cemetery. He was the second Governor of Delaware to die in office.

Almanac
Elections were held October 1, and members of the General Assembly took office on October 20 or the following weekday. State legislative councilors had a three-year term, and state assemblymen had a one-year term.

Beginning in 1792 elections were held on the first Tuesday of October, and members of the General Assembly took office the first Tuesday of January. Also in 1792 the State Legislative Council was renamed the State Senate, and the State House of Assembly became the State House of Representatives. The State President became the governor and was popularly elected. He takes office the third Tuesday in January and had a three-year term.

References

External links
Biographical Directory of the Governors of the United States
Biographical Directory of the United States Congress
Biography by Russell Pickett
Delaware's Governors

The Political Graveyard

Places with more information
Delaware Historical Society; website; 505 North Market Street, Wilmington, Delaware 19801; (302) 655-7161
University of Delaware; Library website; 181 South College Avenue, Newark, Delaware 19717; (302) 831-2965

1742 births
1797 deaths
People from New Castle, Delaware
18th-century American Episcopalians
American people of English descent
Delaware Federalists
Continental Army officers from Delaware
Delaware lawyers
Members of the Delaware House of Representatives
Delaware state senators
Governors of Delaware
Federalist Party state governors of the United States
People of colonial Delaware
Burials in New Castle County, Delaware
18th-century American politicians